Jhikargachha is an upazila of Jessore District in the Division of Khulna, Bangladesh.

Demographics
According to the 2011 Bangladesh census, Jhikargachha had a population of 298,908. Males constituted 49.22% of the population and females 50.78%. Muslims formed 94.26% of the population, Hindus 4.82%, Christians 0.89% and others 0.03%. Jhikargachha had a literacy rate of 53.02% for the population 7 years and above.

At the 1991 Bangladesh census, Jhikargachha had a population of 235,882. Males constituted 51.24% of the population and females 48.76%. The population aged 18 or older is 119,652. Jhikargachha has an average literacy rate of 27.9% (7+ years), compared to the national average of 32.4%.

Administration
Jhikargacha thana was turned into an upazila in 1983.

Jhikargacha Upazila is divided into Jhikargacha Municipality and 11 union parishads: Bankra, Ganganandapur, Gadkhali, Hajirbagh, Jhikargachha, Magura, Nabharan, Nibaskhola, Panisara, Shankarpur, and Shimula. The union parishads are subdivided into 164 mauzas and 174 villages.

Jhikargacha Municipality is subdivided into 9 wards and 15 mahallas.

Education

According to Banglapedia, Jhikargacha B. M. High School, founded in 1936, Ganganandapur High School (1940), Jhikargachha Pilot Girls High School (1953), Jhikargacha M. L. High School (1888), and Raghunath Nagar Secondary School (1922) are notable secondary schools.

See also 
 Upazilas of Bangladesh
 Districts of Bangladesh
 Divisions of Bangladesh

References

Upazilas of Jessore District
Jashore District
Khulna Division